Tilachlidiopsis is a genus of fungi in the family Tricholomataceae. It is an anamorphic form of Collybia.

See also
List of Tricholomataceae genera

References

Tricholomataceae
Agaricales genera